Zanthoxylum heterophyllum is a species of plant in the family Rutaceae. It is found in Mauritius and Réunion. It is threatened by habitat loss. 
Formerly this species also occurred in Rodrigues, where it had been eradicated.  In Mauritius less than 40 individuals are known in the wild.

References

heterophyllum
Critically endangered plants
Taxonomy articles created by Polbot